Barry Ryan Enright (born March 30, 1986) is an American golfer and a former professional baseball pitcher and coach. Enright attended St. Mary's High School in Stockton, California and Pepperdine University. He played in Major League Baseball (MLB) for the Arizona Diamondbacks and Los Angeles Angels of Anaheim. Enright has also represented Great Britain internationally, including at the 2019 European Baseball Championship.

Early life
Prior to playing professionally, Enright attended St. Mary's High School and then Pepperdine University. In his first year at Pepperdine, 2005, he went 10-1 with a 4.62 ERA in 18 starts. The following year, he went 13-2 with a 4.05 ERA in 21 games (20 starts). After the 2006 season, he played collegiate summer baseball with the Brewster Whitecaps of the Cape Cod Baseball League. In 2007, he went 12-5 with a 1.99 ERA in 18 starts. He was drafted in the second round of the 2007 amateur draft by the Arizona Diamondbacks.

Professional baseball career

Arizona Diamondbacks
Enright began his professional career in 2007, splitting the season between three teams - the Yakima Bears (five games), the South Bend Silver Hawks (one game) and the Visalia Oaks (four games). He did not allow a single earned run in 15 combined innings of work, and he struck out 17 batters. In 2008, he pitched for the Oaks, going 12-8 with a 4.44 ERA in 29 starts. With the Mobile Bay Bears in 2009, Enright went 10-9 with a 3.98 ERA in 27 starts. He began 2010 with the Mobile Bay Bears, going 4-1 with a 2.88 ERA in 14 starts prior to his call-up to the major leagues.  In 2011 while he was pitching for the Reno Aces, Enright threw a pitch behind Josh Donaldson of the Sacramento River Cats (who tagged Enright for a home run in the game earlier) and was promptly ejected along with Donaldson as the benches and bullpens cleared.

Los Angeles Angels of Anaheim
On July 24, 2012, Enright was traded to the Los Angeles Angels of Anaheim for cash considerations. On Tuesday, April 30, 2013 Enright surrendered a two-run walk-off home run to Oakland Athletics slugger Brandon Moss in the nineteenth inning. The home run, which ended the longest game in Angels history, took place over six and a half hours after the first pitch, which was thrown by the Athletics' Dan Straily 7:05PM PT the previous day. He was designated for assignment on May 16, 2013. He was outrighted to AAA on May 19, 2013. He elected free agency on November 4, 2013.

Philadelphia Phillies
Enright signed a minor league deal with the Philadelphia Phillies on January 24, 2014. He was released in July after posting a 5.58 ERA in 19 starts for the Lehigh Valley IronPigs. He had been 1-7 with a 7.57 ERA in his last nine games started with the IronPigs.

Los Angeles Dodgers
Enright signed a minor league deal with the Los Angeles Dodgers on July 28, 2014. He appeared in 7 games (5 starts) for the AAA Albuquerque Isotopes, where he was 0-4 with an 8.62 ERA. The Dodgers released him on April 5, 2015.

Toros de Tijuana
On May 6, 2015, Enright signed with the Toros de Tijuana of the Mexican League.

San Diego Padres
On January 24, 2017, Enright signed a minor league contract with the San Diego Padres.

Colorado Rockies
On May 7, 2017, Enright was traded to the Colorado Rockies in exchange for cash considerations. He elected free agency on November 6, 2017.

Tigres de Quintana Roo
On February 18, 2018, Enright signed with the Tigres de Quintana Roo of the Mexican Baseball League.

Arizona Diamondbacks (second stint)
On July 16, 2018, Enright signed a minor league deal with the Arizona Diamondbacks. He elected free agency on November 2, 2018.

International Career
Enright was selected for the Great Britain national baseball team for the 2019 European Baseball Championship.

Coaching career
Enright announced his retirement Jan. 9, 2019, and worked as the pitching coach for the Hillsboro Hops, a minor-league affiliate of the Arizona Diamondbacks in the Northwest League.

On November 30, 2021, Enright was hired to the Arizona Diamondbacks' major league staff to serve as the assistant major league pitching coach and minor league pitching coordinator.

Golfing career
As of 2020, Enright is trying his hand as a professional golfer. Enright played golf at Pepperdine, and picked up the clubs again in late 2019. In May 2020, Enright beat out a pro field at the TPC Champions Classic in Scottsdale, AZ.

References

External links

1986 births
Living people
Albuquerque Isotopes players
American expatriate baseball players in Mexico
Arizona Diamondbacks players
Baseball players from California
Brewster Whitecaps players
Jackson Generals (Southern League) players
Lehigh Valley IronPigs players
Los Angeles Angels players
Major League Baseball pitchers
Mayos de Navojoa players
Mexican League baseball pitchers
Mobile BayBears players
Naranjeros de Hermosillo players
Pepperdine Waves baseball players
Reno Aces players
Salt Lake Bees players
South Bend Silver Hawks players
Tiburones de La Guaira players
Great Britain national baseball team players
American expatriate baseball players in Venezuela
Tigres de Quintana Roo players
Toros de Tijuana players
Visalia Oaks players
Yakima Bears players
2019 European Baseball Championship players
Arizona Diamondbacks coaches